Kenny Shields (October 24, 1947—July 21, 2017) was a Canadian musician and the lead singer of rock band Streetheart, known for singing various hits, including "Action," "Hollywood," "Look in Your Eyes," "What Kind of Love Is This," and a cover of The Rolling Stones classic "Under My Thumb."

Early life 

Shields was born and spent his youth in Nokomis, Saskatchewan, a small farming community. He developed an interest in music early in his life, enrolling in an amateur talent show at six years old.

Early career 

Shields moved to Saskatoon to attend the University of Saskatchewan and joined the local band Witness Incorporated. The band started touring the country, opening for Roy Orbison and Cream. His career was sidetracked in 1970 when he was critically injured in a car accident.

Shields returned to music in 1975 and moved to Regina, Saskatchewan following the dissolution of Witness Incorporated. He began performing with local musicians and soon formed the band that would become Streetheart. The band became a success in Canada, frequently playing cities across the country and recording six studio albums and one double-disc live album. Their more popular tour mates would include AC/DC, Styx and Max Webster.

Later career and death 

After the original Streetheart lineup dissolved, with two of them leaving to form Loverboy, Shields would continue to tour as the Kenny Shields Band throughout the 1980s. He would reunite with some of the original group  in the late 1990s to play festival shows.

In 2017, Shields was forced to back out of the band's 40th anniversary tour when he became disoriented and confused during a Canada Day concert in Sherwood Park, Alta. He had undergone an emergency surgery and a combination of health problems led to the band cancelling its 40th anniversary tour.

Shields died at St. Boniface General Hospital in Winnipeg. Band mate Jeff Neill, via the band's Facebook page, confirmed on July 21, 2017 that Shields died that morning.

References

1947 births
2017 deaths
Canadian rock musicians
Canadian male singers
People from Rural Municipality Wreford No. 280, Saskatchewan